Larry Williams (1935–1980) was an American rhythm and blues and rock and roll singer.

Larry Williams may also refer to:
Larry Williams (American football) (born 1963), American football offensive guard
Larry Williams (basketball), (born 1980) streetball basketball player
Larry Williams (director), co-director of the TV movie Brave New World
Larry Williams (horn player), American horn player; see Brian Wilson
Larry Williams (jazz musician), member of Seawind and keyboardist for Al Jarreau
Larry Williams (politician) (born 1943), member of the West Virginia House of Delegates
Larry Williams Jr. (born 1985), American football defensive back
Larry J. Williams, member of the Alabama House of Representatives
Larry R. Williams (born 1942), publisher and promoter of trading ideas and father of actress Michelle Williams
Larry Williams, convicted of manslaughter in relation to the death of Hana Grace-Rose Williams
Larry E. Williams, composer of "Let Your Love Flow"

See also
Laurie Williams (disambiguation)
Lawrence Williams (disambiguation)